The 2023 Campeonato Mineiro (officially Campeonato Mineiro SICOOB 2023 – Módulo I for sponsorship reasons) will be the 109th edition of the state championship of Minas Gerais organized by the FMF. The competition started on 21 January and ended on 8 April 2023.

Atlético Mineiro defended its tri-championship and earn the 48th title.

Format

First stage
The 2023 Módulo I first stage will be played by the ten teams participating in 2023 Módulo I not relegated, in addition to the two teams promoted from 2022 Módulo II. These 12 teams will compete in the tournament divided into three groups of four teams in the first phase. Like what happens in the Campeonato Paulista, the teams will only duel with opponents from the other groups.
At the end of the first phase, the leaders of the 3 groups plus the best second place overall qualify for the semifinals.

Knockout stage
The knockout phase will be played between the 4 best placed teams from the previous phase in a two-handed tie in the semi-finals and the finals, where the team with the best seed will win the right to choose the order of the legs. The team with the best campaign in the initial phase will have an advantage of two draws or a victory and defeat by the same goal difference.

Relegation
According to the change made by the Federação Mineira de Futebol, the descent will be decided in a triangular disputed by the three teams with the worst overall campaign in the initial phase. That is, not necessarily the last one of a group will dispute the triangular one, being able to have made a better campaign compared to other teams of other groups.

Participating teams

First stage

Group A

Group B

Group C

Relegation stage
In the relegation stage, each team will be played the other two teams in a single round-robin tournament.

Standings and Results

Troféu Inconfidência

Bracket

Knockout stage

Bracket

Semi-finals

Group F

Tied 1–1 on aggregate, Atlético Mineiro advanced to the finals due to their best performance in the first stage.

Group G

América Mineiro advanced to the finals.

Finals

Top goalscorers

References

External links
 Campeonato Mineiro Official Website

Campeonato Mineiro seasons
Mineiro
2023 in Brazilian football